St. Mary is an unincorporated community in St. Mary Township, Waseca County, Minnesota, United States, near Waseca.  The community is located near the junction of Waseca County Roads 9 and 29, and 320th Avenue.  The Le Sueur River flows nearby.

References  

Unincorporated communities in Waseca County, Minnesota
Unincorporated communities in Minnesota